Never Gonna Let You Go is the debut album by singer-songwriter Vicki Sue Robinson.  The album includes the hit "Turn the Beat Around".  In 2010, Gold Legion Records remastered this album.

Track listing
"Turn the Beat Around" – 5:35	
"Common Thief" – 5:39	
"Never Gonna Let You Go" – 4:22	
"Wonderland of Love" – 3:46	
"We Can Do Almost Anything" – 3:11	
"Lack of Respect" – 3:03	
"When You're Lovin' Me" – 4:17	
"Act of Mercy" – 4:23

Personnel
Vicki Sue Robinson - Lead & Background Vocals
Bhen Lanzaroni - Keyboards
Bob Rose, Dick Frank - Guitar
Stuart Woods - Bass
Jimmy Young, Roy Markowitz - Drums
Carlos Martin - Congas
George Devens - Percussion
Ray Armando - Congas, Percussion
Alan Raph, Tom Malone, Tony Studd, Wayne Andre - Trombone
Burt Collins, Joe Shepley - Trumpet
Art Kaplan - Baritone Saxophone, Flute
George Young - Tenor Saxophone, Flute

Charts

Singles

References

Cover and Type Design- Craig DeCamps

External links
 Vicki Sue Robinson-Never Gonna Let You Go at Discogs

1976 debut albums
RCA Records albums
Vicki Sue Robinson albums